Radio Busovača or Radio postaja Busovača is a Bosnian local public radio station, broadcasting from Busovača, Bosnia and Herzegovina. Estimated number of potential listeners is around 51,507.

Radio Busovača was launched in 1993. Program is mainly produced in Croatian and Bosnian. This radio station broadcasts a variety of programs such as music, local news, and talk shows.

Frequencies
 Busovača

See also 
List of radio stations in Bosnia and Herzegovina

References

External links 
 www.radio-busovaca.com
 Communications Regulatory Agency of Bosnia and Herzegovina

Busovača
Radio stations established in 1993